The NAL Hansa (Sanskrit: Swan) is an Indian all-composite low wing tricycle gear two-seater general aviation monoplane for flight training as well as personal flying. An upgraded version of aircraft dubbed as Hansa-"NG" was flown later in September 2021 and expects certification in following 4 months to be acquired by various flying clubs.

Design and development
The Hansa (Sanskrit: हंस (swan)) was designed by the National Aerospace Laboratories of India under the NAL-Light Aircraft Project. Three designs were produced and the second-design (Hansa-2) was built as a prototype which first flew on 23 November 1993. The second prototype was based on the third design (Hansa-3) and this was the design selected for production. A pre-production aircraft was also built.

The Hansa received a provisional type certificate from the DGCA in December 1998 and a full certificate in December 1998.

An upgraded version dubbed as "Hansa-NG" was test flown on 3 September 2021 expecting certification from DGCA in early 2022. The aircraft as a glass cockpit, digitally controlled Rotax 912 ISC engine, electrically operated flaps and long endurance.

The production of Hansa-NG will start in 2022-23.

Operational history
The production variant was built by Taneja Aerospace and Aviation Limited with the first flight on 14 May 1999. Sixteen production aircraft have been built and delivered to various flying clubs, with NAL maintaining three.

NAL further has revived 72 intent letters from various flying clubs for Hansa-NG.

Variants
Hansa-2
Prototype as originally flown
Hansa-2RE
The prototype was re-engined and the span increased, first flown 26 January 1996.
Hansa-3
Production version of the 2RE.
Hansa-S
Originally known as the Hansa-4 it has a more powerful diesel engine (230 hp).
Hansa UAV
Unmanned trainer aircraft
Hansa-NG
Hansa "Next Generation", the more advanced version with better aerodynamics, manufacturing methods and avionics, in development. The aircraft has a glass cockpit, a fuel injected engine and uses electrically operated flaps. Aircraft powered by Rotax 912iSc Engine with Digital display through CANAerospace protocol. Maiden flight was on 3rd September 2021. Flight Testing is on progress. Also glass cockpit system includes dual Aspen EFD1000pro, GPS integrated NAVCOM system and secondary COM system.

Specifications (HANSA-3)

See also

References

Jackson, Paul. Jane's All The World's Aircraft 2003–2004. Coulsdon, UK: Jane's Information Group, 2003. .

External links
 NAL's flyer on Hansa

1990s Indian civil trainer aircraft
Hansa